Tinissa spaniastra is a moth of the family Tineidae. It was described by Edward Meyrick in 1932. It is found in Ethiopia.

References

Moths described in 1932
Scardiinae
Insects of Ethiopia
Insects of Tanzania
Moths of Africa